Terry A. D. Strickland (born February 15, 1992) is an American convicted murderer who was arrested for the murder of two men in July 2016. On December 15, 2016, Strickland was added to the FBI's Top Ten Most Wanted list. Strickland was arrested in El Paso, Texas on January 15, 2017.

Capture 
Strickland was arrested in El Paso, Texas on January 15, 2017 by city FBI agents and policemen. He was apprehended without incident during a traffic stop at 5:10 a.m. MT and booked into the El Paso county jail. The FBI's public tip line was contacted earlier in the month suggesting that Strickland was living in the city.

Strickland was extradited back to Wisconsin following his arrest in Texas. In June 2017, Strickland was found guilty of two counts of first-degree reckless homicide. He was sentenced the following month to 60 years in prison.

References

External links 
FBI Top 10 profile of Terry A D Strickland

1992 births
2016 murders in the United States
American murderers
FBI Ten Most Wanted Fugitives
Fugitives
Living people